The Aimoré, Botocudoan or Borum languages, now sometimes known as Krenakan after the last one remaining, are a branch of the Macro-Jê languages - spoken mainly in Brazil -  including moribund Krenak and extinct languages such as Guerén and Nakrehé. Loukotka (1968) considered them dialects of a single language, but more recent treatments (Campbell 1997, Campbell 2012) describe at least some of them as separate languages.

Languages
A fair amount of lexical data was collected before the majority of languages became extinct.

Loukotka (1968)
Loukotka (1968) illustrates the following:
Krekmun/Kraik-mús, Krenak (Crenaque), Pejaurún (Cajaurun), Naknanuk (Nacnhanuc, Nakyananiuk), Xiporoc (Shiporoc, Yiporok, Djiporoca), Nak-Ñapma, Bakuen (Bacuen, Bocué), Nakrehé (Nacrehé), Aranãa, Miñan-yirugn, Pojichá (Pozyichá), Gueren
and mentions sources of data for:
Uti Krag (Guti Krag, Ngùd-Kràg), 
reported in 1913 to still be spoken.  Miñan-yirugn and some of the other might still have been spoken in Loukotka's time.

Other varieties sometimes reported in the literature, but of which nothing is known, include Ankwet (Anquet) and Xónvúgn (Chonvugn).

Mason (1950)
Mason (1950) lists:

Botocudo (Aimboee, Borun)
Araná (Aranya)
Crecmun
Chonvugn (Crenak)
Gueren
Gutucrac: Minya-yirugn (Minhagirun)
Nachehe (Nakrehe)
(Yiporok [Giporok]: Poicá [Poyishá, Požitxá])
(Anket ?)
(Nacnyanuk ?)

Varieties
Below is a full list of Botocudo (Aimoré; Batachoa) varieties listed by Loukotka (1968), including names of unattested varieties.

Krekmun / Kraik-mús - extinct dialect once spoken on the right shore of the Jequitinhonha River, Minas Gerais.
Crenaque / Krenak - once spoken on the left bank of the Doce River.
Pejaurún / Cajaurun - once spoken on the Doce River.
Naknanuk / Nakyananiuk - spoken between the Jequitinhonha River, Mucuri River, and São Mateus River.
Hereːkere - once spoken on the Jequitinhonha River. (Unattested)
Jirun - once spoken on the Jequitinhonha River. (Unattested)
Imató - once spoken on the Doce River. (Unattested)
Xiporoc / Djiporoca - formerly spoken on the São Mateus River near Pepinuque.
Bacuen / Bocué - once spoken on the Mucuri River near Imburana (now in the municipality of Ecoporanga, Espírito Santo).
Poruntun - once spoken on the São Mateus River. (Unattested)
Nak-ñapma - formerly spoken between the Mutum River and Pancas River.
Nacrehé - spoken at the sources of the Manhuaçu River.
Miñan-yirugn - originally spoken between the Doce River and São Mateus River, now only by a few individuals in Posto Pancas, state of Espirito Santo.
Urufu - once spoken to the east of the Bacuen tribe. (Unattested)
Aranãa - spoken by a few individuals on the Aranãa River, state of Minas Gerais.
Mutun - once spoken in the Mutum River valley, Espirito Santo. (Unattested)
Maconcuji - once spoken near Santa Clara do Mucuri, Bahia. (Unattested)
Bavan - extinct dialect once spoken on the Mucuri River near the city of Teófilo Otoni. (Unattested)
Catarana - once spoken in the vicinity of the city of Araçuaí (Unattested)
Imburú - once spoken on the Doce River and Jequitinhonha River. (Unattested)
Xópxóp - once spoken on the Doce River near Resplendor. (Unattested)
Arari / Ariari - once spoken between the Araçuaí River and Jequitinhonha River. (Unattested)
Norek - formerly spoken near Teófilo Otoni on the Noreth River. (Unattested)
Poté / Porun - extinct dialect once spoken in the vicinity of Teófilo Otoni near Pote. (Unattested)
Tambakori - once spoken on the Itambacuri River. (Unattested)
Pojichá / Pozyichá - extinct dialect formerly spoken on the Todos os Santos River.
Uti Krag / Nakpie / Guti Krag / Ngùd-Kràg - originally spoken between the Doce River and Pancas River, now by a few individuals in Colatina, state of Espirito Santo.
Etwet - once spoken at the sources of the Manhuaçu River. (Unattested)
Nakporuk - once spoken on the right bank of the Guandu River. (Unattested)
Nepnep - once spoken between the Mucuri River and São Mateus River. (Unattested)
Pampam - once spoken on Pampã River. (Unattested)
Porokun - once spoken on the São Mateus River. (Unattested)
Mekmek - once spoken on the Lages River. (Unattested)
Usnus - extinct dialect from the right bank of the Jequitinhonha River. (Unattested)
Ankwet - spoken in the Serra dos Aimorés, perhaps extinct now. (Unattested)
Xónvúgn - once spoken between the Mutum River and Aranãa River. (Unattested)
Gueren / Borun - originally spoken on the Paruhipe River, later near the city of Olivença, Alagoas state; now perhaps extinct.
Maracá - extinct language once spoken in the Serra do Espinhaço, Bahia state. (Unattested)

Vocabulary
Several lexical loans from one of the Língua Geral varieties have been found identified. Examples include tuŋ ‘flea’ and krai ‘non-Indigenous person, foreigner’.

Loukotka (1968) lists the following basic vocabulary items for the Botocudo languages.

Footnotes

References
Alain Fabre, 2005, Diccionario etnolingüístico y guía bibliográfica de los pueblos indígenas sudamericanos: BOTOCUDO

 
Nuclear Macro-Jê languages
Indigenous languages of Eastern Brazil